Sir William Pecche (9 February 1359 – 1399) was an English politician.

Life
Pecche was the son of MP and Mayor of London, John Pecche. He married Joan Hadley, a daughter and coheiress of John Hadley, MP for London 1369–1402. Pecche's heir was his son, John.

Career
Pecche was Member of Parliament for Kent in 1394 and September 1397.

References

1359 births
1399 deaths
English MPs 1394
English knights
English MPs September 1397